Lawrence Michael Andrew Goodliffe (1 October 1914 – 20 March 1976) was an English actor known for playing suave roles such as doctors, lawyers and army officers. He was also sometimes cast in working-class parts.

Biography

Goodliffe was born in Bebington, Wirral, the son of a vicar, and educated at St Edmund's School, Canterbury, and Keble College, Oxford. He began his career in repertory theatre in Liverpool before joining the company of the Stratford Memorial Theatre in Stratford upon Avon. He joined the British Army at the beginning of the Second World War, and received a commission as a Second Lieutenant in the Royal Warwickshire Regiment in February 1940. He was wounded in the leg and captured at the Battle of Dunkirk. Goodliffe was incorrectly listed as killed in action, and even had his obituary published in a newspaper. He was to spend the rest of the war a prisoner in Germany.

Whilst in captivity he produced and acted in (and in some cases wrote) many plays and sketches to entertain fellow prisoners. These included two productions of William Shakespeare's Hamlet, one in Tittmoning and the other in Eichstätt, in which he played the title role. He also produced the first staging of Noël Coward's Post-Mortem at Eichstätt. A full photographic record of these productions exists.

After the war, he resumed his professional acting career. As well as appearing in the theatre, he worked in film and television. He appeared in The Wooden Horse (1950) and in other POW films. His best-known film was A Night to Remember (1958), in which he played Thomas Andrews, designer of the RMS Titanic. His best-known television series was Sam (1973–75) in which he played an unemployed Yorkshire miner. He also appeared with John Thaw and James Bolam in the 1967 television series Inheritance.

Suffering from depression, Goodliffe had a breakdown in 1976 during the period that he was rehearsing for a revival of Equus. He committed suicide a few days later by leaping from a hospital fire escape while a patient at the Atkinson Morley Hospital in Wimbledon, which has been converted to residential use and is now called 'Wimbledon Hill Park'.

Filmography

 The Small Back Room (1949) as Till
 Stop Press Girl (1949) as McPherson
 The Wooden Horse (1950) as Robbie
 Captain Horatio Hornblower (1951) as Col. Caillard - POW Escort
 Cry, the Beloved Country (1951) as Martens
 The Hour of 13 (1952) as Anderson
 Sea Devils (1953) as Ragan
 Rob Roy, the Highland Rogue (1953) as Robert Walpole
 Front Page Story (1954) as Kennedy
 John Wesley (1954)
 The Crowded Day (1954) as Eve's Husband
 The End of the Affair (1955) as Smythe
 The Adventures of Quentin Durward (1955) as Count De Dunois
 The Way Out (1955) as John Moffat
 Wicked as They Come (1956) as Larry Buckham
 The Battle of the River Plate (1956) as Captain McCall - R.N., British Naval Attache for Buenos Aires
 Fortune Is a Woman (1957) as Detective Insp. Barnes
 The One That Got Away (1957) as R.A.F. Interrogator
 Carve Her Name With Pride (1958) as Coding Expert
 The Camp on Blood Island (1958) as Father Paul Anjou
 Up the Creek (1958) as Nelson
 A Night to Remember (1958) as shipbuilder Thomas Andrews
 Three Crooked Men (1958) as Shop customer
 Further Up the Creek (1958) as Le. Commander Blakeney
 The 39 Steps (1959) as Brown
 The White Trap (1959) as Inspector Walters
 Sink the Bismarck! (1960) as Captain Banister
 Testament of Orpheus (1960) as English narrator (voice, uncredited)
 The Battle of the Sexes (1960) as Detective
 Conspiracy of Hearts (1960) as Father Desmaines
 Peeping Tom (1960) as Don jarvis
 The Trials of Oscar Wilde (1960) as Charles Gill
 No Love for Johnnie (1961) as Dr. West
 The Day the Earth Caught Fire (1961) as 'Jacko' Jackson - Night Editor
 Jigsaw (1962) as Clyde Burchard
 80,000 Suspects (1963) as Clifford Preston
 A Stitch in Time (1963) as Doctor on Children's Ward (uncredited)
 Man in the Middle (1963) as Col. Shaw
 Woman of Straw (1964) as Solicitor (uncredited)
 633 Squadron (1964) as Squadron Leader Frank Adams
 The 7th Dawn (1964) as Trumphey
 The Gorgon (1964) as Professor Jules Heitz
 Troubled Waters (1964) as Jeff Driscoll
 Von Ryan's Express (1965) as Captain Stein
 The Night of the Generals (1967) as Hauser
 The Jokers (1967) as Lt. Col. Paling
 The Fixer (1968) as Ostrovsky
 Cromwell (1970) as Solicitor General
 The Fifth Day of Peace (1970) as Gen. Snow
 The Johnstown Monster (1971) as McNeil
 Henry VIII and His Six Wives (1972) as Thomas More
 Hitler: The Last Ten Days (1973) as Gen. Helmuth Weidling
 The Man with the Golden Gun (1974) as Bill Tanner, Chief of Staff (uncredited)
 To the Devil a Daughter (1976) as George de Grass

Television

References

External links
 
 
 Comprehensive site on Goodliffe's life and career including full photographic record of wartime productions

1914 births
1976 deaths
People educated at St Edmund's School Canterbury
English male film actors
British World War II prisoners of war
English male television actors
English male stage actors
People from Bebington
Alumni of Keble College, Oxford
Royal Warwickshire Fusiliers officers
Artists' Rifles soldiers
British Army personnel of World War II
World War II prisoners of war held by Germany
Suicides in Wimbledon
Suicides by jumping in the United Kingdom
Royal Shakespeare Company members
20th-century English male actors
1976 suicides